Gang is a 2000 Indian Hindi-language gangster drama film directed by Mazhar Khan. The film stars Kumar Gaurav, Jackie Shroff, Nana Patekar,  Javed Jaffrey,  Juhi Chawla and Imtiaz Khan in pivotal roles. The film began production in 1990 and was delayed for 10 years because of director Mazhar Khan's ill health. After his death in 1998, his assistant director helped complete the film for release on 14 April 2000. The film was also the last to feature music by RD Burman who died in 1994.

Plot
Four friends, Gangu (Jackie Shroff), Abdul (Nana Patekar), Nihal (Kumar Gaurav) and Gary (Jaaved Jaffrey) - which forms the word G.A.N.G, get together to start their crime business, but their roots are built on friendship and trust. They succeed in their criminal goals, but later they are attacked by a local gangster Tagdu (Gulshan Grover). As a result, G.A.N.G. retaliates with Tagdu and joins with Lala (Mukesh Khanna), a criminal leader with a conscience. But this does not pleases Abdul as they work for free with Lala and decides to join forces with Girja Singh (Imtiaz Khan), another gang leader, for money, to which Gangu disagrees. Gary's sister is later killed by Tagdu and his men as a form of early humiliation, which shatters them deeply. Later G.A.N.G. and Tagdu's men are embroiled in a gang war, in which Gangu is arrested and sentenced to jail for five years.

When Gangu is released, he witnesses that Abdul is now driving a taxi, his mother is well looked after and that Nihal and Gary have also started doing business. It is when Gangu meets his sweetheart, Sanam (Juhi Chawla), and proposes marriage, and subsequently learns that his friends are working with Girja Singh. Nihal and Divya (Ektaa Sohini) marriage begins to fall apart as their child is born handicapped due to the former's drug addiction and later Divya commits suicide with her child. This incident shatters Nihal and he goes on a murder spree, for which he is arrested. Girja orders Abdul to kill Nihal, before he gives the statement against him to the court. However Abdul, indebted towards their friendship, kills Girja's henchman instead of Nihal. Finally, Abdul and Gary decides to surrender to the police for the sake of Gangu and seeks the help of the chief minister (Raza Murad). But this displeases the latter as if they are arrested, and they will even testify against him, so he plans to murder the G.A.N.G. with the help of Girja and Tagdu.

Tagdu kills Gangu's mother in order to weaken the team, but G.A.N.G. finishes the minister's men, including Tagdu and Girja. In the process, Gangu is severely injured and is on his deathbed and asks them for a promise to leave the crime world forever, to which all agree and Gangu dies after. The G.A.N.G. is about to surrender to the police, till the point where the minister orders the police for "shoot to kill" and kills them.

6 years later, Lala kills the minister who had ordered the police force to kill G.A.N.G. Lala admits to Sanam that he had killed the minister to end the story so that Gangu's son won't go on the same path as 4 men did. He later surrenders himself to Shamsher Singh and Sanam shows the photo of the G.A.N.G. to her son, remembering them in peace.

Cast 
 Jackie Shroff as Gangu
 Nana Patekar as Abdul
 Kumar Gaurav as Nihal Singh
 Javed Jaffrey as Gary Rozario 
 Juhi Chawla as Sanam
 Ekta Sohini as Divya
 Imtiaz Khan as Girja Singh
 Gulshan Grover as Tagdu
 Shagufta Ali as Tinnie Rozario (Gary's sister)
 Mukesh Khanna as Majeed Lala
 Dalip Tahil as Police Commissioner Shamsher Singh
 Usha Nadkarni as Gangu's mother
 Deepak Shirke as Pradhuman, Girja's brother
 Raza Murad as Chief Minister
 Razak Khan as Major
 Anurag Kashyap as Police Officer

Development
Director Mazhar Khan had started the project in 1990 which faced years of delays due to his ill-health. Amjad Khan was cast as the villain but replaced by his brother Imtiaz Khan after his death in 1992. Khan revived the project which was nearing completion in 1998 but later died on 16 September 1998 due to kidney failure, thus keeping the production work on hold. However, in 1999, Mashkoor Chowdhry, the assistant worked on the film's remaining direction, technical aspects and leftover production.

Soundtrack
The music of this movie was mainly composed by Anu Malik. R. D. Burman composed only one track, Chhodke Na Jana, sung by Asha Bhosle, for the film. But since the movie faced late release and his death, Mazhar Khan signed in Anu Malik for the composition. It can be noted that Anu Malik used some bits of the background score composed by Burman, of the movie, Caravan for the song Dil Hai Bechain in the late composer's remembrance. All of the songs are written by Javed Akhtar.

References

Bibliography

External links
 

2000 films
2000s Hindi-language films
Films scored by Anu Malik
Films scored by R. D. Burman
2000 crime drama films
2000s crime action films
2000s action drama films
Indian crime action films
Films shot in Mumbai
Films about organised crime in India
Films about drugs
Indian crime drama films
Indian action drama films
Indian gangster films
Films about suicide
Films set in Mumbai